Pearl-Maiden: A Tale of the Fall of Jerusalem is a novel by British writer H. Rider Haggard.

References

External links
Complete book at Project Gutenberg
 
Images and bibliographic information for various editions of Pearl-Maiden at SouthAfricaBooks.com

Novels by H. Rider Haggard
1903 British novels
Novels set in Israel
Siege of Jerusalem (70 CE)